James Edward Moore (November 29, 1902 – January 28, 1986) was a United States Army four-star general who served as the United States High Commissioner of the Ryukyus after World War II.

Early life and career

James Edward Moore was born in New Bedford, Massachusetts, on November 29, 1902. He graduated from the United States Military Academy in 1924 and served in the Army until his retirement in 1963. Notable assignments include: Chief of Staff, 35th Infantry Division 1942, Chief of Staff, 30th Infantry Division 1942–43, Chief of Staff, XII Corps 1943, Chief of Staff, Fourth United States Army 1943–44, Chief of Staff, Ninth United States Army 1944–45, Chief of Staff, Second United States Army 1945–46, Deputy Chief of Staff, Second United States Army 1946–47, Commanding General, South Sector, United States Army-Pacific 1947–48, Secretary of the Army General Staff 1948–50, Commanding General, 10th Mountain Division 1950–51, At Fitzsimons Army Hospital 1951–53, Commandant, United States Army War College 1953–55, United States High Commissioner, Ryukyu Islands and Commanding General, IX Corps 1955–58, Deputy Army Chief of Staff (Military Operations) 1958–59, Chief of Staff, SHAPE 1959–63.

Moore received the Army Distinguished Service Medal (two awards), Legion of Merit (three awards), and Bronze Star Medal.

Personal life
Moore married Mildred May Lindberg (April 29, 1903 – September 25, 1976) in 1926. The couple had a son, two daughters and sixteen grandchildren. After the death of his wife, Moore remarried in April 1982 with Anne Ramsey Farrell, the widow of Lieutenant General Francis William Farrell.

Moore died on January 28, 1986, from respiratory arrest at Walter Reed Army Medical Center. He is buried in Arlington National Cemetery with his first wife Mildred Lindberg Moore.

References

External links
Generals of World War II

1902 births
1986 deaths
People from New Bedford, Massachusetts
United States Military Academy alumni
Recipients of the Legion of Merit
United States Army generals
Recipients of the Distinguished Service Medal (US Army)
Burials at Arlington National Cemetery
United States Army generals of World War II
Military personnel from Massachusetts